The Oxford Dictionary of Quotations is the Oxford University Press's large quotation dictionary. It lists short quotations that are common in English language and culture. The 8th edition, with 20,000 quotations over 1126 pages, was published for print and online versions in 2014. The first edition was published in 1941. 

It begins with a preface explaining the term quotation:

The dictionary has been compiled from extensive evidence of the quotations that are actually used [as direct quotations]....
This book is not—like many quotations dictionaries—a subjective anthology of the editor's favourite quotations, but an objective selection of the quotations which are most widely known and used. Popularity and familiarity are the main criteria for inclusion, although no reader is likely to be familiar with all the quotations in this dictionary....
The quotations are drawn from novels, plays, poems, essays, speeches, films radio and television broadcasts, songs, advertisements, and even book titles. It is difficult to draw the line between quotations and similar sayings like proverbs, catch-phrases, and idioms. For example, some quotations (like “The opera ain’t over till the fat lady sings”) become proverbial. These are usually included if they can be traced to a particular originator.... Catch-phrases are included if there is evidence that they are widely remembered or used.

Editions
The first edition, in 1941, was compiled by a committee drawn from the staff of the OUP under the editorship of Alice Mary Smyth (later Alice Mary Hadfield). She recounts some of the details of choosing and processing quotations in her book on the life of Charles Williams (one of the committee). Later editions of the Dictionary were published in 1953 and thereafter, the 6th edition appearing in 2004, the 7th in 2009, and the 8th in 2014, all edited by Elizabeth Knowles.

Oxford also publishes a Concise edition (9000 quotations) and a Little edition (4000 quotations).

The Oxford Dictionary of Quotations by Subject is organized thematically.

See also
 Bartlett's Familiar Quotations
 The Yale Book of Quotations

References

Sources
 Hadfield, Alice Mary.  An Introduction to Charles Williams.  London: Robert Hale Ltd., 1959.
 Smyth, Alice Mary, ed.  The Oxford Book of Quotations.  [First Edition.]  London: OUP, 1941.

External links
Official site (pay site)

Books of quotations
English non-fiction literature
Quotations
1941 non-fiction books
English-language books